Escadron de Transport 3/61 Poitou is a French Air and Space Force squadron located at Orléans – Bricy Air Base, Loiret, France which operates the Lockheed C-130H Hercules, Transall C-160 and the de Havilland Canada DHC-6 Twin Otter.

See also

 List of French Air and Space Force aircraft squadrons

References

French Air and Space Force squadrons